Durresi block is a large off-shore Albanian oil and gas field. It was discovered in 2003. It is Albania's largest offshore oil and gas field.

See also

Patos Marinza
Oil fields of Albania

References

Oil fields of Albania